Jean Guillemay du Chesnay, called Rosidor, was a 17th-century French playwright and actor.

First a comedian in the Troupe du Marais, Rosidor composed a five-act tragedy entitled La Mort du Grand Cyrus ou La Vengeance de Tomiris en 1662. He also wrote a comedy Les divertissements du Temps ou la Magie de Mascarille and another play, Les amours de Merlin en 1671, although some sources date the plays in 1691 and attribute them to his son Claude. (father and son sharing the same nickname, this is a great source of confusion) Rosidor played in the satire La critique des Satures de Monsieur Boileau in 1668, a play which was quickly forbidden.

Rosidor became the leader of a troupe that moved in 1669 to the Danish court where it gave performances both in French and in German. However, the death of King Frederick III in 1670 put an end to their business. The troupe performed later in Germany where she served the Duke of Celle and in Italy.

Rosidor married Charlotte Meslier, the daughter of a couple of comedians trained by Mathias Meslier and Nicole Gassot with whom he had a son, Claude-Ferdinand Guillemay du Chesnay who would also be an actor.

Works 
1662: La Mort du Grand Cyrus ou La Vengeance de Tomiris, Cologne ou Liège, Guillaume-Henri Streel.
1671: Les divertissements du Temps ou la Magie de Mascarille, Rouen.
1671: Les amours de Merlin, Rouen.

Bibliography 
 Émile Campardon, Les comédiens du Roi de la Troupe française, Genève, 1970
 J. Fransen, Les comédiens français en Hollande au XVII et XVIIIe siècles, Genève, 1978

References 

17th-century French dramatists and playwrights
17th-century French male writers
17th-century French male actors
French male stage actors
Year of birth missing
Year of death missing